Joshua Kent "Josh" Boone (born December 5, 1992 in Greenville, South Carolina) is a Filipino-American soccer player, currently playing for Wehen Wiesbaden U23 in Germany. He qualifies for the Philippines through his grandmother.

References

External links
Boone's stats in SpVgg Bad Homburg website 

1992 births
American sportspeople of Filipino descent
American expatriate soccer players
American expatriate soccer players in Germany
American soccer players
Dayton Dutch Lions players
Living people
Sportspeople from Greenville, South Carolina
UNC Wilmington Seahawks men's soccer players
USL Championship players
Association football midfielders